Jeremy John Irons (born 19 September 1948) is an English actor and activist. He is one of the few actors who have achieved the Triple Crown of Acting, winning an Oscar for film, an Emmy for television and a Tony Award for theatre. After receiving classical training at the Bristol Old Vic Theatre School, Irons began his acting career on stage in 1969 and has appeared in many West End theatre productions, including the Shakespeare plays The Winter's Tale, Macbeth, Much Ado About Nothing, The Taming of the Shrew, and Richard II. In 1984, he made his Broadway debut in Tom Stoppard's The Real Thing, receiving the Tony Award for Best Actor in a Play.

Irons's break-out role came in the ITV series Brideshead Revisited (1981) which is frequently ranked among the greatest British television dramas as well as greatest literary adaptations. His first major film role came in The French Lieutenant's Woman (1981), for which he received a BAFTA nomination for Best Actor. After starring in dramas such as Moonlighting (1982), Betrayal (1983), The Mission (1986), and Dead Ringers (1988), he received the Academy Award for Best Actor for his portrayal of the accused attempted murderer Claus von Bülow in Reversal of Fortune (1990).

Irons starred in Kafka (1991), The House of the Spirits (1993), and M. Butterfly (1993). He voiced Scar in Disney's The Lion King (1994) for which he won the Annie Award for Outstanding Achievement for Voice Acting in a Feature Production, played Simon Gruber in Die Hard with a Vengeance (1995), Humbert Humbert in Lolita (1997) and Aramis in The Man in the Iron Mask (1998). He starred in The Merchant of Venice (2004), Being Julia (2004), Kingdom of Heaven (2005), Eragon (2006), Appaloosa (2008), and Margin Call (2011). He portrayed Alfred Pennyworth in Batman v Superman: Dawn of Justice (2016), Justice League (2017), and Zack Snyder's Justice League (2021).

On television, Irons appeared in the HBO miniseries Elizabeth I, receiving Primetime Emmy Award for Outstanding Supporting Actor in a Limited Series or Movie. From 2011 to 2013, he starred as Pope Alexander VI in the Showtime historical series The Borgias. In 2019, he appeared as Adrian Veidt / Ozymandias in HBO's Watchmen. In October 2011, he was nominated the Goodwill Ambassador for the Food and Agriculture Organization of the United Nations.

Early life and education 
Irons was born on 19 September 1948 in Cowes on the Isle of Wight, to Paul Dugan Irons, an accountant, and Barbara Anne Brereton Brymer (née Sharpe).  Irons has a brother, Christopher (born 1943), and a sister, Felicity Anne (born 1944). He was educated at the independent Sherborne School in Dorset from 1962 to 1966. He was the drummer and harmonica player in a four-man school band called the Four Pillars of Wisdom.

Acting career

Early work 
Irons trained as an actor at the Bristol Old Vic Theatre School and later became president of its fundraising appeal. He performed a number of plays, and  busked on the streets of Bristol, before appearing on the London stage as John the Baptist and Judas opposite David Essex in Godspell, which opened at the Roundhouse on 17 November 1971 before transferring to Wyndham's Theatre playing a total of 1,128 performances.

Television 

Irons's television career began on British television in the early 1970s, including appearances on the children's series Play Away and as Franz Liszt in the BBC series Notorious Woman (1974). More significantly, he starred in the 13-part adaptation of H. E. Bates's novel Love for Lydia (1977) for London Weekend Television, and attracted attention for his key role as the pipe-smoking German student, a romantic pairing with Judi Dench, in Harold Pinter's screenplay adaptation of Aidan Higgins's novel Langrishe, Go Down (1978) for BBC Television.

The role which significantly raised his profile was Charles Ryder in the television adaptation of Evelyn Waugh's Brideshead Revisited (1981). First broadcast on ITV, the show ranks among the most successful British television dramas, with Irons receiving a Golden Globe nomination for his performance. Brideshead reunited him with Anthony Andrews, with whom he had appeared in The Pallisers seven years earlier. Around the same time he starred in the film The French Lieutenant's Woman (also 1981) opposite Meryl Streep.

After these major successes, he played the leading role of an exiled Polish building contractor, working in the Twickenham area of southwest London, in Jerzy Skolimowski's independent film Moonlighting (1982). On 23 March 1991, he hosted Saturday Night Live on NBC in the US, and appeared as Sherlock Holmes in the Sherlock Holmes' Surprise Party sketch. In 2004 Irons played Severus Snape in the BBC's Comic Relief's Harry Potter parody, "Harry Potter and the Secret Chamberpot of Azerbaijan".

In 2005, Irons won both an Emmy Award and a Golden Globe Award for his supporting role in the TV mini-series, Elizabeth I, in which he starred opposite Helen Mirren (Queen Elizabeth I). A year later, he was one of the participants in the third series of the BBC documentary series Who Do You Think You Are? In 2008, he played Lord Vetinari in Terry Pratchett's The Colour of Magic, an adaptation for Sky One.

On 6 November 2008, TV Guide reported Irons would star as photographer Alfred Stieglitz with Joan Allen as painter Georgia O'Keeffe, in a Lifetime Television biopic, Georgia O'Keeffe (2009). Irons also appeared in the documentary for Irish television channel TG4, Faoi Lán Cheoil, in which he is seen taking fiddle lessons from Caoimhín Ó Raghallaigh.

On 12 January 2011, Irons was a guest-star in an episode of Law & Order: Special Victims Unit called "Mask". He played Dr. Cap Jackson, a sex therapist. He reprised the role on an episode titled "Totem" that ran on 30 March 2011. Irons stars in the 2011 US premium cable network Showtime's series The Borgias, a highly fictionalised account of the Renaissance dynasty of that name. On 8 November 2018, it was announced that Irons had been cast as Adrian Veidt / Ozymandias in HBO's Watchmen series.

Film 

Irons made his film debut in Nijinsky in 1980. In addition to Moonlighting and The French Lieutenant's Woman, he appeared in the Cannes Palme d'Or winner The Mission in 1986 and in the dual role of twin gynaecologists in David Cronenberg's Dead Ringers in 1988. Irons would later win Best Actor for Dead Ringers from the New York Film Critics Circle that year. Other films include Danny the Champion of the World (1989), Reversal of Fortune (1990), for which he won the Academy Award for Best Actor, Kafka (1991), Damage (1993), M. Butterfly (1993) working again with David Cronenberg, The House of the Spirits (1993) appearing again with Glenn Close and Meryl Streep. He lent his deep baritone voice as Scar in The Lion King (1994). Afterwards, he portrayed as Simon Gruber in Die Hard with a Vengeance (1995), co-starring Bruce Willis and Samuel L. Jackson, Bernardo Bertolucci's Stealing Beauty (1996), the 1997 remake of Lolita, and as the musketeer Aramis opposite Leonardo DiCaprio in the 1998 film version of The Man in the Iron Mask.

Other roles include the wicked wizard Profion in the film Dungeons and Dragons (2000) and Rupert Gould in Longitude (2000). He played the Über-Morlock in the film The Time Machine (2002). In 2004, Irons played the title character in The Merchant of Venice. In 2005, he appeared in the films Casanova opposite Heath Ledger, and Ridley Scott's Kingdom of Heaven. He has co-starred with John Malkovich in two films, The Man in the Iron Mask (1998) and Eragon (2006), though they didn't have any scenes together in the latter.

In 2006, Irons appeared with Laura Dern in David Lynch's Inland Empire. In 2008, Irons co-starred with Ed Harris and Viggo Mortensen in Appaloosa, directed by Harris. In 2011, Irons appeared alongside Kevin Spacey in the thriller Margin Call. In 2012, he starred and worked as executive producer of the environmental documentary film Trashed. He portrayed the mathematician G. H. Hardy in the 2015 film The Man Who Knew Infinity. Irons played Alfred Pennyworth in Warner Bros.' Batman v Superman: Dawn of Justice (2016), Justice League (2017) and the 2021 director's cut of the same film. In 2018, he played General Vladimir Korchnoi in Francis Lawrence's spy thriller film Red Sparrow, based on Jason Matthews's book of the same name. In 2021, Irons played Rodolfo Gucci in Ridley Scott's biographical crime drama film House of Gucci. In 2022, Irons played British Prime Minister Neville Chamberlain in the period spy thriller Munich – The Edge of War.

Theatre 
Irons has worked with the Royal Shakespeare Company three times in 1976, 1986–87 and 2010. After years of success in the West End in London, Irons made his New York debut in 1984 and won a Tony Award for his Broadway performance opposite Glenn Close in The Real Thing.

After an absence from the London stage for 18 years, in 2006 he co-starred with Patrick Malahide in Christopher Hampton's stage adaptation of Sándor Márai's novel Embers at the Duke of York's Theatre.

He made his National Theatre debut playing former British Prime Minister Harold Macmillan (1957–1963) in Never So Good, a new play by Howard Brenton which opened at the Lyttelton on 19 March 2008. In 2009, Irons appeared on Broadway opposite Joan Allen in the play Impressionism. The play ran through 10 May 2009 at the Gerald Schoenfeld Theater.

Europe Theatre Prize 
On 17 December 2017 he was awarded the XVI Europe Theatre Prize, in Rome. The Prize organization stated:With Jeremy Irons, life and art have been mixed to the point of creating an inimitable style, as man and actor, which blends an air of freedom with the enviable capacity to enter into the spirit of the most varied productions, in theatre, cinema and television, without ever betraying himself or giving up his independence. In productions great and small, with an unflinching love for his profession, Jeremy Irons says of himself: «I became an actor to be a rogue and vagabond, so I don’t think the establishment would be able to welcome me as one of its own – because I’m not.» Irons also has that freedom that comes from knowing how to master to perfection all the possibilities of a trade which is among the most difficult in the world. His versatility as an actor, as much at ease in Shakespeare as in a hit television series, comes from being part of a profession that he loves and in which he is loved. His experience and his pragmatism allow him to confront, more or less radically but always with great honesty, the questions bound up with his working world, not only in terms of actor training but also in politics and the contradictions of the times we live in. In awarding the Europe Theatre Prize to Jeremy Irons, we are rewarding an artist who has set an example that is admired in the four corners of the world. At the same, we should be aware that this prize is going to a man who, reflecting on the course of his career, has said: «The idea of a career seems to me like a prison sentence. I will have started from the bottom and made my way to reach the top of the ladder, then I’ll retire and some time afterwards I’ll be dead... For an outsider like me, that all seems very, very attractive.»On that occasion he performed with Isabelle Huppert Correspondence 1944-1959 Readings from the epistles between Albert Camus and Maria Casares and a special creation of Harold Pinter's Ashes to Ashes, at the Teatro Argentina in Rome.

Other ventures

Audio 
Irons has had extensive voice work in a range of different fields throughout his career. He read the audiobook recording of Evelyn Waugh's Brideshead Revisited, Paulo Coelho's The Alchemist, Vladimir Nabokov's Lolita (he had also appeared in the 1997 film version of the novel), and James and the Giant Peach by the children's author Roald Dahl.

In particular, he was praised for recording the poetry of T. S. Eliot for BBC Radio 4. Beginning in 2012 with The Waste Land, he went on to record Four Quartets in 2014, The Love Song of J. Alfred Prufrock on the centenary of its publication in 2015, and Old Possum's Book of Practical Cats in 2016. He finally completed recording the entire canon of T. S. Eliot which was broadcast over New Year's Day 2017. In 2020, Irons was one of 40 British voices to read three to four verses (broadcast daily) of Samuel Taylor Coleridge’s 150-verse 18th century poem The Rime of the Ancient Mariner.

One of his best known film roles has turned out to be lending his distinctive voice to Scar in The Lion King (1994) serving as the main antagonist of the film. Irons has since provided voiceovers for three Disney World attractions. He narrated the Spaceship Earth ride, housed in the large geodesic globe at Epcot in Florida from October 1994 to July 2007. He was also the English narrator for the Studio Tram Tour: Behind the Magic at the Walt Disney Studios Park at Disneyland Paris. He voiced H. G. Wells in the English-language version of the former Disney attraction The Timekeeper. He also reprised his role as Scar in Fantasmic. He is also one of the readers in the 4x CD boxed set of The Fairy Tales of Oscar Wilde, produced by Marc Sinden and sold in aid of the Royal Theatrical Fund.

He serves as the English-language version of the audio guide for Westminster Abbey in London. He voiced English soldier and WWI poet Siegfried Sassoon in The Great War and the Shaping of the 20th Century (1997), receiving the Primetime Emmy Award for Outstanding Voice-Over Performance. Irons has served as voice-over in several big cat documentary films (multiple by National Geographic): Eye of the Leopard (2006), The Last Lions (2011), The Unlikely Leopard (2012), Game of Lions (2014), for which he received the Primetime Emmy Award for Outstanding Narrator, Jade Eyed Leopard (2020), Revealed: Ultimate Enemies (2022), and Revealed: Eternal Enemies (2022). Between 2009 and 2012 he narrated the French-produced documentary series about volcanoes, Life on Fire.

In 2008, two researchers, a linguist and a sound engineer, found "the perfect [male] voice" to be a combination of Irons's and Alan Rickman's voices based on a sample of 50 voices. Coincidentally, the two actors played brothers in the Die Hard series of films. Speaking at 200 words per minute and pausing for 1.2 seconds between sentences, Irons came very close to the ideal voice model, with the linguist  Andrew Linn explaining why his "deep gravelly tones" inspired trust in listeners. As German villain Simon Gruber his recital of the English riddle "As I was going to St Ives" (from Die Hard with a Vengeance) appears in the 2014 book The Art of Communicating Eloquently. In 2017 he recited the spoken sections, most notably "Late Lament", for The Moody Blues' 50th Anniversary Tour of "Days Of Future Passed", and also appears on the video presentation.

Music 
In 1985, Irons directed a music video for Carly Simon and her heavily promoted single, "Tired of Being Blonde", and in 1994, he had a cameo role in the video for Elastica's hit single "Connection".

Irons has contributed to other musical performances, recording William Walton's Façade with Dame Peggy Ashcroft, Stravinsky's The Soldier's Tale conducted by the composer, and in 1987 the songs from Lerner and Loewe's My Fair Lady with Dame Kiri Te Kanawa, released on the Decca label. Irons sang segments of  "Be Prepared" in the film The Lion King.

To mark the 100th anniversary of Noël Coward's birth, Irons sang a selection of his songs at the 1999 Last Night of the Proms held at the Royal Albert Hall in London, ending with "London Pride", a patriotic song written in the spring of 1941 during the Blitz. In 2003, Irons played Fredrik Egerman in a New York revival of Stephen Sondheim's A Little Night Music, and two years later appeared as King Arthur in Lerner and Loewe's Camelot at the Hollywood Bowl. He performed the Bob Dylan song "Make You Feel My Love" on the 2006 charity album Unexpected Dreams – Songs From the Stars.

In 2009, Irons appeared on the Touchstone album Wintercoast, recording a narrative introduction to the album. Recording took place in New York City in February 2009 during rehearsals for his Broadway play Impressionism.

Political views and activism 
At the 1991 Tony Awards, Irons was one of the few celebrities to wear the red ribbon to support the fight against AIDS. He was the first celebrity to wear it onscreen.

In 1998, Irons and his wife were named in the list of the biggest private financial donors to the Labour Party, a year following its return to government with Tony Blair's victory in the 1997 general election, following eighteen years in opposition. He was also one of several celebrities who endorsed the parliamentary candidacy of the Green Party's Caroline Lucas at the 2015 general election.

In 2004, he publicly declared his support for the Countryside Alliance, referring to the 2004 Hunting Act as an "outrageous assault on civil liberties" and "one of the two most devastating parliamentary votes in the last century".

Irons is an outspoken critic of the death penalty and has supported the campaign by the human rights organisation Amnesty International UK to abolish capital punishment worldwide. Among his arguments, Irons states the death penalty "infringes on two fundamental human rights, the right to life, and no-one shall be subject to torture", adding that while the person accused of a crime "may have abused those rights, to advocate the same be done to them is to join them".

During a 2007 Q&A with The Guardian, Irons named Tony Blair as the living person he most admired; reasoning "For living so publicly with the knowledge that he's not perfect." He then named George W. Bush as the living person he most despised, stating “to hold his position he should have surrounded himself with more reliable people.”

In 2009, Irons signed a petition in support of Polish film director Roman Polanski, calling for his release after he was arrested in Switzerland in relation to his 1977 charge for drugging and raping a 13-year-old girl.

In 2011, Irons was criticised in the British Medical Journal for his fundraising activities in support of the College of Medicine, an alternative medicine lobby group in the UK linked to King Charles.

In 2013, Irons caused controversy for an interview with the Huffington Post, in which he said he "doesn't have a strong feeling either way" on gay marriage but expressed fears that it could "debase marital law", suggesting it could be "manipulated" to allow fathers to avoid paying tax when passing on their estates to their sons, because he supposed "incest laws would not apply to men". He later clarified his comments, saying he was providing an example of a situation that could cause a "legal quagmire" under the laws that allow same-gender marriage, and that he had been "misinterpreted". He added that "some gay relationships are healthier than their heterosexual counterparts". He said in a BBC interview that he wished he had "buttoned his lip" before asking if its legalisation would see fathers marry sons.

He supports the legal availability of abortion, having said that he believes that "women should be allowed to make the decision". Irons also agreed with an abortion opponent and was quoted as saying that "the church is right to say it's a sin".

Charity work 
He is the Patron of the "Emergency Response Team Search and Rescue" or "ERTSAR" which is a life saving United Nations recognised disaster response search and rescue team and registered Charity. It is based in his home County of Oxfordshire, England.  He supports a number of other charities, including the Prison Phoenix Trust in England, and the London-based Evidence for Development which seeks to improve the lives of the world's most needy people by preventing famines and delivering food aid, for both of which he is an active patron. In 2000, Irons received the Golden Plate Award of the American Academy of Achievement presented by Awards Council member Olivia de Havilland during the International Achievement Summit in London.

In 2010, Irons starred in a promotional video, for "The 1billionhungry project" – a worldwide drive to attract at least one million signatures to a petition calling on international leaders to move hunger to the top of the political agenda.

Irons was named Goodwill Ambassador of the Food and Agriculture Organization of the United Nations in 2011. He provided the narration of the 2013 documentary (by Andrew Lauer) Sahaya Going Beyond about the work of the charity Sahaya International.

In November 2015, Irons supported the No Cold Homes campaign by the UK charity Turn2us. Irons was one of nearly thirty celebrities, who included Helen Mirren, Hugh Laurie and Ed Sheeran, to donate items of winter clothing to the campaign, with the proceeds used to help people in the UK struggling to keep their homes warm in winter.

Irons is a patron of the Chiltern Shakespeare Company, which produces Shakespearean plays annually in Beaconsfield, Buckinghamshire, and a London-based drama school, The Associated Studios. Irons was bestowed an Honorary Life Membership by the University College Dublin Law Society in September 2008, in honour of his contribution to television, film, audio, music, and theatre. Also in 2008, Irons was awarded an Honorary Doctorate by Southampton Solent University. On 20 July 2016, Irons was announced as the first Chancellor of Bath Spa University.

Personal life 

Irons married Julie Hallam in 1969, but they divorced later that year. He married Irish actress Sinéad Cusack on 28 March 1978. They have two sons, Samuel "Sam" Irons (born 1978), who works as a photographer, and who co-starred with his father in Danny, the Champion of the World, and Maximilian "Max" Irons (born 1985), also an actor. Both of Irons's sons have appeared in films with their father. Irons's wife and children are Catholic; Irons has also been described as a practising Catholic and has stated:

He owns Kilcoe Castle near Ballydehob, County Cork, Ireland, and had the castle painted a traditional ochre colour which was misreported as being 'pink'. He also has another Irish residence in The Liberties of Dublin, as well as a home in his birth town of Cowes, a detached house and barn in Watlington, Oxfordshire and a mews house in Notting Hill, London.

In March 2016 Irons told the BBC Radio 4 Today programme that he would refuse an invitation to the palace to accept a New Year Honour should it ever arrive: "I became an actor to be a rogue and a vagabond so I don't think it would be apt for the establishment to pull me in as one of their own, for I ain't."

In 2013 Irons said he was a smoker and an avid fan of cigars, naming Romeo y Julieta as his favourite brand. He said, "My curse is that I’m a cigarette smoker. I make my own cigarettes. So I have a tendency to inhale when I smoke a cigar. I have to keep reminding myself not to."

Acting credits

Awards and nominations

References

External links

 Jeremy Irons – The Authoritative Website
 
 
 
 
 
 
 
 
 
 Jeremy Irons Profile by The Daily Telegraph (13 March 2008)

1948 births
Living people
20th-century English male actors
21st-century English male actors
Alumni of Bristol Old Vic Theatre School
Annie Award winners
Audiobook narrators
Best Actor Academy Award winners
Best Actor Genie and Canadian Screen Award winners
Best Drama Actor Golden Globe (film) winners
Best Supporting Actor Golden Globe (television) winners
British people of Irish descent
British people of Scottish descent
César Honorary Award recipients
Cusack family (Ireland)
David di Donatello winners
English male film actors
English male Shakespearean actors
English male stage actors
English male television actors
English male voice actors
English people of Irish descent
English people of Scottish descent
English Roman Catholics
FAO Goodwill ambassadors
Jeremy Irons
Labour Party (UK) people
British political activists
Outstanding Narrator Primetime Emmy Award winners
Outstanding Performance by a Male Actor in a Miniseries or Television Movie Screen Actors Guild Award winners
Outstanding Performance by a Supporting Actor in a Miniseries or Movie Primetime Emmy Award winners
People educated at Sherborne School
People from Cowes
Primetime Emmy Award winners
Royal Shakespeare Company members
Tony Award winners